The Herbert Power Stakes is a Melbourne Racing Club Group 2 Thoroughbred horse race held under quality handicap conditions, for horses aged three years old and older, over a distance of 2400 metres. It is held at Caulfield Racecourse in Melbourne, Australia. Prizemoney is A$300,000.

History
The race was named after former Victoria Amateur Turf Club Chairman and thoroughbred owner Herbert Power (1833–1919), who was instrumental in the formation of the sport of racing in the early days of the Colony of Victoria. He joined the original Melbourne Club in 1859 and played an integral part in the merger in 1864 of the Victorian Turf Club and Victorian Jockey club to form today's Victoria Racing Club. In 1875, he was one of a band of racing enthusiasts who founded the Victoria Amateur Turf Club.  He was a member of the VATC committee, and he was chairman in 1889, 1896 and 1907. When he retired from the committee he was appointed one of the trustees of the Caulfield racecourse. He was one of the auditors of the VRC from 1880 until 1905.

The race is considered an important lead-up to the Caulfield and Melbourne Cups.

During World War II the race was run at Flemington Racecourse.

Name
1898–1919  - Eclipse Stakes
1920–1992  - Herbert Power Handicap
1993–1996  - Quick-Eze Stakes
1997  - Perrier Mineral Water Stakes
1998–1999  - Perrier Stakes
2000  - Herbert Power Stakes
2001–08 - Winning Edge Presentations Stakes
2009 onwards - Herbert Power Stakes

Distance
1898–1899 - 1 mile (~1600 metres)
1900–1919 - 1 miles (~2200 metres)
1920–1971 - 1 miles (~2400 metres)
1972 onwards - 2400 metres

Grade
1898–1978 - Principal Race
1979–1980 - Group 3
1981 onwards - Group 2

Doubles wins
The following thoroughbreds have won the Herbert Power Stakes – Melbourne Cup double in the same year.
 Rogan Josh (1999), Arwon (1978), Van Der Hum (1976), Gala Supreme (1973), Sirius (1944) and Poseidon (1906)

The following thoroughbreds have won the Herbert Power Stakes – Caulfield Cup double in the same year.
 Master O'Reilly (2007), Beer Street (1970), Rising Fast (1955), My Hero (1953),  Poseidon twice (1906 and 1907), Marvel Loch (1905)

Winners 

 2022 - Saracen Knight
 2021 - Delphi
 2020 - Chapada
 2019 - The Chosen One
 2018 - Yucatan
 2017 - Lord Fandango
 2016 - Assign
 2015 - Amralah
 2014 - Big Memory
 2013 - Sea Moon
 2012 - Shahwardi
 2011 - Tanby 
 2010 - Linton
 2009 - Alcopop
 2008 - Dolphin Jo
 2007 - Master O'Reilly
 2006 - Growl
 2005 - Leica Falcon
 2004 - Rizon
 2003 - Yakama
 2002 - The Secondmortgage
 2001 - Freemason
 2000 - Majestic Avenue
 1999 - Rogan Josh
 1998 - Magneto
 1997 - Bonsai Pipeline
 1996 - The Bandette
 1995 - Unsolved
 1994 - Solo Show
 1993 - Great Vintage
 1992 - Aquidity
 1991 - Princess Pushy
 1990 - Just A Dancer
 1989 - Nayrizi
 1988 - Congressman
 1987 - Cossack Warrior
 1986 - Pharostan
 1985 - Fil De Roi
 1984 - Colonial Flag
 1983 - Nostradamus
 1982 - Carringbush
 1981 - Flashing Light
 1980 - Mr.Independent
 1979 - Pigalle
 1978 - Arwon
 1977 - Impeller
 1976 - Van der Hum
 1975 - Suleiman
 1974 - Big Angel
 1973 - Gala Supreme
 1972 - Scotch And Dry
 1971 - Spectre
 1970 - Beer Street
 1969 - Alsop
 1968 - Impetus
 1967 - Padtheway
 1966 - Gala Crest
 1965 - Captain Blue
 1964 - Sybeau
 1963 - Straight Irish
 1962 - Silver Pelt
 1961 - Nilarco
 1960 - Optic Prince
 1959 - Mac
 1958 - King Nero
 1957 - Pandie Sun
 1956 - Fighting Force
 1955 - Rising Fast
 1954 - Wodalla
 1953 - My Hero
 1952 - Durham
 1951 - Durham
 1950 - Dashing Beau
 1949 - Dashing Beau
 1948 - Howe
 1947 - Riot
 1946 - Sir Actor
 1945 - Logical
 1944 - Claudette
 1943 - Mac Rob
 1942 - † Portfolio / Colonus
 1941 - Historian
 1940 - Rex Felt
 1939 - Respirator
 1938 - Marauder
 1937 - International
 1936 - Desert Chief
 1935 - Red Ray
 1934 - Broad Arrow
 1933 - Segati
 1932 - Scalpel
 1931 - Shadow King
 1930 - Second Wind
 1929 - Taisho
 1928 - Strephon
 1927 - Royal Charter
 1926 - The Banker
 1925 - Royal Charter
 1924 - Easingwold
 1923 - Easingwold
 1922 - Purser
 1921 - Eurythmic
 1920 - Tangalooma
 1919 - Eusebius
 1918 - Outlook
 1917 - Pah King
 1916 - Cyklon
 1915 - Burrabadeen
 1914 - Anna Carlovna
 1913 - Anna Carlovna
 1912 - Lady Medallist
 1911 - Comedy King
 1910 - Master Soult
 1909 - Alawa
 1908 - Alawa
 1907 - Poseidon
 1906 - Poseidon
 1905 - Marvel Loch
 1904 - Nuncio
 1903 - Wakeful
 1902 - Wakeful
 1901 - Bonnie Chiel
 1900 - Kinglike
 1899 - Australian Star
 1898 - Cocos

† Run in divisions

See also
 List of Australian Group races
 Group races

References

Horse races in Australia
Open middle distance horse races
Caulfield Racecourse